Jarlskog is a Swedish surname, where 'skog' means a forest. Notable people with the surname include:

 Cecilia Jarlskog (born 1941), Swedish theoretical physicist
 Ida Jarlskog (born 1998), Swedish tennis player

Swedish-language surnames